Nizami Pashayev (born February 2, 1981 in Gadabay) is a retired Azerbaijani athlete in weightlifting.

Career
He won two World Weightlifting Championships titles and one European Weightlifting Championships title, when he hauled 402 kilograms in total to take the overall gold in the men's 94 kg category.

Pashayev totalled 402 kg on May 20, 2006, but it was the 25-year-old's snatch winning effort of 186 kg that helped him gain the title ahead of Poland's Szymon Kolecki who was second in the clean and jerk with 217 kg. Later that year Pashayev was disqualified for two years after failing a WADA drugs test. He lost his European title and was fined $2,400.

On 17 November 2016 the IOC disqualified Pashayev from the 2008 Olympic Games and struck his results from the record for failing a drugs test in a re-analysis of his doping sample from 2008.

References

External links
 
 Nizami Pashayev at Lift Up
 
 
 

1981 births
Azerbaijani sportspeople in doping cases
Azerbaijani male weightlifters
Doping cases in weightlifting
Living people
Weightlifters at the 2000 Summer Olympics
Weightlifters at the 2004 Summer Olympics
Weightlifters at the 2008 Summer Olympics
Olympic weightlifters of Azerbaijan
European Weightlifting Championships medalists
World Weightlifting Championships medalists